Kailashmandau used to be VDC in Bajura District in the Seti Zone of north-western Nepal. At the time of the 2011 Nepal census it had a population of 9,586 and had 1818 houses. There is a small market and it is also the junction to many villages of this region.

History
Previously this VDC had 9 wards which are now all part of Triveni Municipality. Previous ward no. 1 to 9 are now converted into ward no. 6 to 9.
This place is locally known as Danda डाँडा.

Demography
People living here belongs to Chhetri, Brahmin, Damai, Kami, and Sarki.

Temple and Religious Place
 Nateshwori Temple
Maure Chhetra

Occupation
Agriculture is the main occupation of the people here.

Road & Transport
It is connected by Maure- Kailashmandu road section, which further extends till Pandara ward no. 6 of Triveni Municipality.

Education
The number of schools have increased over the year. Education level and teaching techniques are still traditional. Masteshwori Higher Secondary School and Ratna Higher Secondary School have computer and wifi facility too. These higher secondary schools provide +2 level programs in Humanities and Education.

Higher Secondary Schools
Masteshwori Higher Secondary School
Ratna Higher Secondary School

Secondary school
Parwati Secondary School
Kailaseswori Secondary School

Lower Secondary School
Nateshwori Secondary School
Narsingh Secondary School

Primary schools
Nitteshwori Primary School
Bajura Model Academy

References

Populated places in Bajura District
Village development committees (Nepal)